The Girl from the Revue is a 1928 German silent film directed by Richard Eichberg and starring Dina Gralla, Werner Fuetterer, and Max Hansen.

Cast

References

Bibliography

External links 
 

1928 films
Films of the Weimar Republic
German silent feature films
Films directed by Richard Eichberg
UFA GmbH films
German black-and-white films
1920s German films